Haemateulia placens is a species of moth of the family Tortricidae. It is found in Valparaíso Province, Chile.

The wingspan is about 16 mm. The ground colour of the forewings is cream, slightly tinged with brownish and with brown dots and small strigulae (fine streaks). The hindwings are pale brownish, but darker on the periphery.

Etymology
The species name refers to the shape of the sterigma and is derived from Latin placens (meaning nice or fancy).

References

Moths described in 2010
Euliini
Moths of South America
Taxa named by Józef Razowski
Endemic fauna of Chile